The Cook Islands competed at the 2018 Commonwealth Games in the Gold Coast, Australia from April 4 to April 15, 2018. The Cook Islands delegation consisted of 18 athletes (7 male and eleven female) that competed across four sports: athletics (track and field), lawn bowls, swimming and weightlifting. It was The Cook Islands's 11th appearance at the Commonwealth Games.

On February 27, 2018, track and field athlete Patricia Taea was named as the nation's flag bearer at the opening ceremony.

Taiki Paniani and Aidan Zittersteijn won the country's first ever Commonwealth Games medal, when they won bronze in the men's pairs lawn bowls event.

Medalists

Competitors
The following is the list of number of competitors participating at the Games per sport/discipline.

Athletics (track and field)

The Cook Islands entered three athletes (one male and two female).

Track & road events

Field events

Lawn bowls

The Cook Islands entered ten lawn bowlers (five male and five female).

Men

Women

Swimming

The Cook Islands entered three swimmers (two male and one female).

Men

Women

Weightlifting

The Cook Islands entered two female weightlifters.

See also
Cook Islands at the 2018 Summer Youth Olympics

References

Nations at the 2018 Commonwealth Games
Cook Islands at the Commonwealth Games
2018 in Cook Islands sport